The Honourable Henry Hamilton (1692–1743) was an Irish politician who sat in two Irish parliaments.

Birth and origins 

Henry was born in February 1692, the third and youngest son of Gustavus Hamilton and his wife Elizabeth Brooke. His father would in 1715 be ennobled as Baron Stackallan and in 1717 advanced to Viscount Boyne.

Henry's mother was the eldest daughter of Sir Henry Brooke by his second wife, Anne St George. Brooke was knight of Brookeborough, County Fermanagh, and governor of Donegal Castle. Henry had two brothers and one sister, who are listed in his father's article.

Honourable 
On 20 October 1715, his father was created Baron Hamilton of Stackallan. As son of a peer Hamilton acquired the style "The Honourable".

First term as MP 
In the Irish election of 1715 the Henry Hamilton was elected as one of the two members of parliament (MPs) for St Johnstown Borough in the House of Commons of the only Irish Parliament of King George I. He held that seat during the entire duration of the parliament from 12 November 1715 to 11 June 1727 when it was dissolved by the king's death.

Marriage and children 
On 27 October 1722, Hamilton married Mary Dawson, eldest daughter of Joshua Dawson. 

Henry and Mary had five sons and two daughters. His third son Sackville was under-secretary to the Lord Lieutenant of Ireland, while his fourth son Henry was governor of Bermuda and Dominica.

Second term as MP 
Hamilton did not contest the Irish election of 1727, which was held for the only Parliament of King George II, which lasted from 14 November 1727 to 25 October 1760. However, in 1730 he contested and won the by-election for one of the two seats for Donegal County that resulted from the death of Alexander Montgomery on 19 December 1729. Hamilton sat for this county until his death in 1743 when he was replaced by Andrew Knox. His father and his two older brothers Frederick and Gustavus had also represented County Donegal in the House of Commons.

Death and timeline 
He was Collector of the Port of Cork. Henry died on 3 June 1743.

See also 
 List of parliaments of Ireland

Notes and references

Notes

Citations

Sources 

  – 1771 to 1800
 
  – Ab-Adam to Basing (for Abercorn)
  – Bass to Canning (for Boyne)
  – Scotland and Ireland
  – (for timeline)
 
 
 
  – Viscounts

1692 births
1743 deaths
Irish MPs 1715–1727
Irish MPs 1727–1760
Members of the Parliament of Ireland (pre-1801) for County Donegal constituencies
Younger sons of viscounts